Yuriy Vazgenovich Sarkisyan (born 30 May 1947) is an Uzbekistani football manager and former player of Armenian descent. He is the first Armenian to lead a national team into an international tournament.

Playing career
He started his footballer career in 1968, at Metallurg from Olmaliq. From 1970 to 1973, he played for Avtomobilist Termez. His last player station was Neftyanik Fergana where he later began his managing career. In his footballer career, he completed 14 seasons and 10 times became top scorer of teams he played. With 241 goals, he is a member of Club 200 of Berador Abduraimov.

Managing career
In 1987, he became manager of Neftchi Farg'ona. Since 1990, he is Merited Trainer of Uzbekistan. From 1992 to 1995, Sarkisyan won with Neftchi Farg'ona five times Uzbek League. From July 2000 to  February 2000, he was coach of Uzbekistan national football team. He was named by UFF five times as Coach of the Year, more than any other uzbek coach ever.

On 16 May 2013, Sarkisyan was sacked as Neftchi coach after club's poor result in recent league matches.
He worked at the club for last 26 years. Sarkisyan was named in uzbek mass media Uzbek Ferguson for long years managing work in Neftchi Farg'ona.

Honours

Manager
Soviet Second League, East conference (1): 1990
Uzbek League (5): 1992, 1993, 1994, 1995, 2001
Uzbek Cup (2): 1994, 1996
Asian Club Championship 3rd: 1995

Individual
Uzbekistan Football Coach of the Year (5): 1998, 1999, 2001, 2003, 2006
Club 200 of Berador Abduraimov member

References

External links

1947 births
Ethnic Armenian sportspeople
Soviet footballers
Armenian footballers
Uzbekistani footballers
Living people
Footballers from Yerevan
FK Neftchi Farg'ona players
Uzbekistan national football team managers
FC Neftchi Farg'ona managers
Uzbekistani people of Armenian descent
Association football forwards
Armenian football managers
Soviet Armenians